Ouma may refer to:
Ouma language
Ouma Rusks
Eric Ouma (born 1996), Kenyan footballer
Francis Ouma (born 1988), Kenyan footballer
Kassim Ouma (born 1978), Ugandan boxer
Mark Ouma (1960-2016), Ugandan journalist
Mohamed Saïd Ouma
Morris Ouma (born 1982), Kenyan cricketer
Oscar Ouma Achieng, Ugandan athlete
Oumah Wallace, Kenyan Statistician